Ornativalva lilyella is a moth of the family Gelechiidae. It was described by Daniel Lucas in 1943. It is found in Algeria.

Adults have been recorded on wing from February to April and in October.

References

Moths described in 1943
Ornativalva